Adrian Breakspear is an English record producer and audio engineer based in Sydney, Australia. He is known for his work with Gang of Youths, Boy & Bear, Ricky Martin and Pharrell Williams.

At the 57th Annual Grammy Awards, he was nominated for co-producing Williams's 2014 album Girl. He received a nomination for Engineer of the Year at the 29th Annual ARIA Awards for his work on Gang of Youths's single "Radioface", and won Producer of the Year at the 31st Annual ARIA Awards for his work alongside Gang of Youths on their album Go Farther in Lightness (2017).

In 2020, he had a cameo role in the Helen Reddy biopic I Am Woman.

Selected Discography

Awards and nominations

ARIA Awards
The ARIA Music Awards, hosted by the Australian Recording Industry Association (ARIA), recognise "excellence and innovation across all genres" of music in Australia.

Breakspear has won one award from three nominations.

Grammy Awards
The Grammy Awards are awarded annually by The Recording Academy of the United States for outstanding achievements in the music industry.

Filmography

References

Notes

External links
 

Living people
1980 births